KBAK-TV (channel 29) is a television station in Bakersfield, California, United States, affiliated with CBS. It is owned by Sinclair Broadcast Group alongside low-power, Class A Fox affiliate KBFX-CD (channel 58). Both stations share studios on Westwind Drive west of Downtown Bakersfield, while KBAK-TV's transmitter is located atop Breckenridge Mountain.

History
The station signed on the air on August 20, 1953, as KAFY-TV. It was originally owned by Sheldon Anderson along with KAFY radio (AM 550, now AM 1100). The station originally operated from studios located on Chester Avenue in Bakersfield. It is Bakersfield's oldest television station; KERO-TV (channel 23) followed a month later. Four months later, Anderson sold the station to Chronicle Publishing Company of San Francisco. KAFY-TV was initially an affiliate of the Dumont television network, later becoming a primary CBS affiliate, sharing ABC programming with KERO-TV until KLYD-TV (channel 17, now KGET-TV) signed on in 1959.

In February 1954, shortly after becoming a full CBS affiliate, channel 29 changed its calls to the current KBAK-TV. The Chronicle sold the station to Reeves Telecom in 1960. As a CBS and later ABC affiliate, KBAK had aired all of each network's color programs in color, and went to full color in 1967. In 1974, KBAK swapped affiliations with channel 17, then known as KJTV, and became an ABC affiliate.

In 1964, Reeves sold KBAK to Chicago-based Harriscope Broadcasting, which also owned WSNS in Chicago (now a Telemundo O&O) and a partial stake in KRQE in Albuquerque (now owned by Nexstar Media Group). In the late 1980s, KBAK started signing off only on Fridays and Saturdays, which as a CBS affiliate it continued to do until May 2008, when the sign-offs on KBAK and KBFX were discontinued and were replaced by a simulcast of the Kern Weather Channel, which is also available on digital cable systems in the Bakersfield area.

In 1986, Harriscope sold KBAK to Burnham Broadcasting, which also owned KHON-TV in Honolulu and would later acquire WVUE in New Orleans, WALA-TV in Mobile, Alabama and WLUK in Green Bay, Wisconsin. In 1995, Burnham sold most of its stations to SF Broadcasting, a joint venture between Fox and Savoy Pictures, but KBAK was not included in the sale to SF Broadcasting, and was instead spun off to Westwind Communications, a locally based company linked to former Burnham executives.

After McGraw-Hill (then-owner of KERO-TV) learned in November 1994 that its KMGH-TV in Denver would be losing its CBS affiliation to KCNC-TV, it signed a groupwide affiliation deal which called for all of its stations, including KMGH-TV and KERO-TV, to become ABC affiliates. KBAK rejoined CBS on March 1, 1996, after KERO-TV's affiliation contract with CBS expired.

On August 6, 2007, Westwind Communications announced the sale of KBAK and KBFX-CA to Fisher Communications of Seattle. The deal closed on January 1, 2008. This marked a re-entry to the Central Valley for Fisher, who had previously bought and sold KJEO (now KGPE) in Fresno in the late 1990s.

In mid May 2010, KBAK became the first station in Bakersfield to begin broadcasting local newscasts in 16:9 widescreen standard definition. Then on January 16, 2011, KBAK took it one step further to become the first station in Bakersfield to launch local news in true high definition. The KBFX shows were included in the upgrade to HD; however, until recently, they were presented in downconverted standard definition widescreen on KBAK-DT2 (which serves as a full-power companion to KBFX's low-power Class A digital terrestrial signal).

KBAK-TV, KBFX, and Fisher Communications' other holdings were sold to Sinclair Broadcast Group in a transaction announced on April 10, 2013. The deal was completed on August 8, 2013. The transaction marked a re-entry into California for Sinclair since it sold off its Sacramento station KOVR to CBS at the end of April 2005.

The current announcer for KBAK and KBFX is nationally recognized voice-over Eric Gordon.

Technical information

Subchannels
The station's digital signal is multiplexed:

Analog-to-digital conversion
KBAK-TV discontinued regular programming on its analog signal, over UHF channel 29, on June 12, 2009, the official date on which full-power television stations in the United States transitioned from analog to digital broadcasts under federal mandate. The station's digital signal remained on its pre-transition UHF channel 33. Through the use of PSIP, digital television receivers display the station's virtual channel as its former UHF analog channel 29.

References

External links

CBS network affiliates
Charge! (TV network) affiliates
Sinclair Broadcast Group
BAK-TV
Television channels and stations established in 1953
1953 establishments in California